Aaron Kleinstub (born August 20, 1989), better known by his stage name Aalias, is an American music producer and musician from Cleveland, Ohio.

Biography
Aaron “Aalias” Kleinstub is a songwriter, composer, producer and multi-instrumentalist.  As a teenager, he won numerous awards playing jazz trumpet, including the Yamaha Young Performing Artist Award, honorable mention from the National Association for the Advancement of the Arts, a Berklee Music Camp scholarship and a selection to perform in the Grammy Jazz Band at 16.  After graduating from Kenston High School in Chagrin Falls, Ohio, Aalias moved to New York to study at Juilliard.  He later transferred to Berklee College of Music, where he graduated with a focus in music production.

Aalias is perhaps best known for co-writing and co-producing the #1 hit song "The Monster" by Eminem featuring Rihanna.  "The Monster" reached #1 on eight separate Billboard charts, including four weeks at #1 on the Hot 100 and thirteen weeks at #1 on the Hot R&B/Hip-Hop Songs chart.  It also topped the charts in twelve countries including Australia, Canada, France, Ireland, New Zealand, Switzerland, and the United Kingdom and won a Grammy for Best/Rap Sung Collaboration.

In 2017, Kleinstub teamed with friend and fellow writer-producer Corey "Latif" Williams to form duo Lo Boii. The band is signed to London-based label AWAL. Its first single "Floor Seats" dropped in April 2019.

Selected discography

References

Living people
American hip hop record producers
Production discographies
1989 births
Musicians from Cleveland